Bom Despacho, Minas Gerais, Brasil.can refer to the following places:
Arcos Minas Gerais
A ferry-terminal on the island of Itaparica, from which car-ferries can be boarded for Salvador.